Samuel Chapman may refer to:
Samuel E. Chapman, member of the Wisconsin State Assembly in 1848 and 1861
Sir Samuel Chapman (British politician) (1859–1947), Scottish Unionist Party politician
Samuel Chapman (philatelist) (1859–1943), British philatelist who was an expert on Mexican stamps
Sam Chapman (1916–2006), American college football player and professional baseball player
Sammy Chapman (born 1938), Northern Irish footballer and football manager
Samuel S. Chapman, fictional senator, in the 1980 film, The Final Countdown